Pilot Mountain may refer to:
 Pilot Mountain (Alberta), a mountain in the Canadian province of Alberta
 Pilot Mountain (British Columbia), a mountain in the Canadian province of British Columbia
 Pilot Mountain (North Carolina), a mountain in the U.S. state of North Carolina
 Pilot Mountain, North Carolina, a town in the U.S. state of North Carolina
 Pilot Mountain (Yukon), a mountain in the Yukon Territory of Canada

See also
 Pilot Butte (disambiguation)
 Pilot Hill (disambiguation)
 Pilot Knob (disambiguation)
 Pilot Peak (disambiguation)